Château de Drulingen is a château in Drulingen, Bas-Rhin, Alsace, France.  The building was built in 1816 by Jean Schmidt (1775-1844) upon his return from the Napoleonic wars. It became a monument historique on 16 July 1987.

References

Châteaux in Bas-Rhin
Monuments historiques of Bas-Rhin
Houses completed in 1816
1816 establishments in France